The Searchers is a 1956 American Western film directed by John Ford.

The Searchers may also refer to:
 Music:
The Searchers (band), a 1960s Merseybeat music group
 The Searchers, a 1979 album by The Searchers
 Titled works in other fields:
  The Searchers (TV series), a 2009 Iranian television police drama
 The Searchers, or Ichneutae, a satyr play by Sophocles
 The Searchers, a comic book published by Caliber Comics

See also
 Searcher (disambiguation)